Swing Your Lady is a 1938 country musical comedy film directed by Ray Enright, starring Humphrey Bogart, Frank McHugh, and Louise Fazenda.  Ronald Reagan is also in the cast in one of his early roles. Daniel Boone Savage, a professional wrestler, made his film debut in this feature. Nat Pendleton was a former Olympic and professional wrestler. In 1938, Brunette singer Penny Singleton was about to turn blonde and embark on a long, hugely successful career playing the iconic comic strip character Blondie in a series of 28 films and a popular radio show.

Bogart was apparently becoming very disenchanted with the film roles that Warner Bros. was offering him at this stage of his career; the following year he appeared in his only horror/sci-fi film, The Return of Doctor X, and these were two roles he never liked talking about when he became a major film star several years later; he considered his performance in Swing Your Lady the worst of his career. 

Swing Your Lady features the first film performance by the Weaver Brothers and Elviry, a comedy troupe better known as The Arkansas Travelers during their many years in vaudeville and on The Grand Old Opry radio show. Following this performance, the trio was picked up by Republic Pictures for Down in Arkansas, the first in what was to be a series of 11 comedy films for the studio.

Swing Your Lady is listed in the 1978 book The Fifty Worst Films of All Time.

Plot
Promoter Ed Hatch comes to the Ozarks with his slow-witted wrestler Joe Skopapoulos whom he pits against a hillbilly Amazon blacksmith, Sadie Horn. Joe falls in love with her and won't fight, at least not until Sadie's beau, Noah, shows up. Love triumphs, despite Ed's machinations, and after defeating Noah, Joe passes on a bout at Madison Square Garden to marry Sadie and take over the blacksmith's shop, while Noah rides away with Ed and his crew.

Cast

References

External links
 
 
 
 

1938 films
1938 romantic comedy films
1930s romantic musical films
1938 musical comedy films
American black-and-white films
American films based on plays
American musical comedy films
1930s English-language films
Films directed by Ray Enright
Films produced by Samuel Bischoff
Films scored by Adolph Deutsch
Warner Bros. films
1930s American films
Films set in the Ozarks
Films about hillbillies